Vladyslav Khomutov (born 4 June 1998) is a Ukrainian professional football midfielder.

Career
Khomutov is a product of FC Olimpik Donetsk and FC Shakhtar Donetsk Youth Sportive School Systems.

In 2014, he signed a contract with Olimpik Donetsk, and played in the reserves. Khomutov made his debut playing as a substitute in the main-squad team in the match against Dnipro Dnipropetrovsk on 15 May 2016 in the Ukrainian Premier League.

Personal life
His father Denys Khomutov is also a retired football player and current manager.

Honours
Nõmme Kalju
Estonian Supercup: 2019

References

External links
 

1998 births
Living people
Ukrainian footballers
Ukrainian expatriate footballers
FC Olimpik Donetsk players
FC Chornomorets Odesa players
Ukrainian Premier League players
Footballers from Donetsk
FC ViOn Zlaté Moravce players
Slovak Super Liga players
Expatriate footballers in Slovakia
Ukrainian expatriate sportspeople in Slovakia
Nõmme Kalju FC players
Expatriate footballers in Estonia
Ukrainian expatriate sportspeople in Estonia
Association football midfielders
Meistriliiga players